Daniele Scarpa (born 3 January 1964) is an Italian sprint canoer who competed from the mid-1980s to 1997. Competing in four Summer Olympics, he won two medals at Atlanta in 1996 with a gold in the K-2 1000 m and a silver in the K-2 500 m events.

Biography
Scarpa also won five medals at the ICF Canoe Sprint World Championships with two golds (K-2 500 m and K-2 1000 m: both 1995), two silvers (K-2 1000 m: 1993, 1994), and a bronze (K-2 10000 m: 1985).

He quit the national team in 1997 to what he claimed was widespread doping. Scarpa also was elected to the local government as a member of the Greens Party. Scarpa married the paralympian archer Sandra Truccolo in 2007 and they offer canoeing courses.

See also
 List of ICF Canoe Sprint World Championships medalists in men's kayak
 List of Olympic medalists in canoeing (men)

References

 
 RAI Profile
 
 Wallechinsky, David and Jaime Loucky (2008). "Canoeing: Men's Kayak Pairs 1000 Meters". In The Complete Book of the Olympics: 2008 Edition. London: Aurum Press, Limited. p. 476.

External links
 
 

1964 births
Canoeists at the 1984 Summer Olympics
Canoeists at the 1988 Summer Olympics
Canoeists at the 1992 Summer Olympics
Canoeists at the 1996 Summer Olympics
Italian male canoeists
Living people
Olympic canoeists of Italy
Olympic gold medalists for Italy
Olympic silver medalists for Italy
Sportspeople from Venice
Olympic medalists in canoeing
ICF Canoe Sprint World Championships medalists in kayak
Canoeists of Fiamme Oro
Medalists at the 1996 Summer Olympics
20th-century Italian people